= Lanthanum disilicide =

Names
- Other names Lanthanum silicide

Identifiers
| CAS Number | 12056-90-5 |
| 3D model (JSmol) | Interactive image |
| ChemSpider | 21241518 |
| EC Number | 235-017-4 |
| PubChem CID | 170843521 |
- InChI: InChI=1S/La.2Si Key: QVKFOXYBEQWBNY-UHFFFAOYSA-N
- SMILES: [Si].[La].[Si]

Properties
| Chemical formula | LaSi_{2} |
| Molar mass | 195.075 g·mol^{−1} |
| Appearance | gray crystals |
| Density | 5.05 g/cm^{3} |
| Melting point | 1,500 °C (2,730 °F; 1,770 K) |
| Solubility in water | insoluble |

Structure
| Crystal structure | Tetragonal, orthorhombic |
- Except where otherwise noted, data are given for materials in their standard state (at 25 °C [77 °F], 100 kPa). Infobox references

Lanthanum disilicide is a binary inorganic compound of lanthanum metal and silicon with the formula LaSi_{2}. Many other lanthanum silicides are known.

== Synthesis ==
- Combine silicon and lanthanum powders, compress the mixture into solid blocks, and melt under vacuum conditions.
- React lanthanum, silicon, and mercury in a quartz tube at 450 °C for 10–12 hours. Subsequently, eliminate surplus mercury through distillation, followed by annealing the resultant material at 450–600 °C.

== Physical properties ==
Lanthanum disilicide forms gray crystals. LaSi_{2} can exist in two crystal structures: tetragonal (α-GdSi_{2} type) and orthorhombic (α-ThSi_{2} type).

The compound is known for its metallic behavior and various applications.

== Chemical properties ==
LaSi_{2} reacts with hydrochloric acid and hydrofluoric acid; insoluble in water.

== Uses ==
The LaSi_{2}-powder is characterized by high electrical resistivity, minimal thermal expansion, and outstanding thermal stability. These properties make it potentially useful for applications in electric heating devices, high-temperature sensors, refractory ceramics, thermal tools, and materials designed for efficient heat conduction.
